The Creating a Respectful and Open World for Natural Hair Act of 2022, known as the CROWN Act of 2022, is a bill in the United States Congress intended to prohibit discrimination based on hairstyle and hair texture by clarifying that such discrimination is illegal under existing federal law. 

The act was first introduced on March 19, 2021, by Representative Bonnie Watson Coleman (D-NJ). The House of Representatives then passed the bill by 235–189 on March 18, 2022.

Background 

The first CROWN Act was adopted in California in July 2019. Since then, similar statutes have been passed by 20 states and 30 cities.

Legislative History 
As of September 6, 2022:

References

External Links 
 Text of H.R. 2116

United States federal labor legislation
Proposed legislation of the 117th United States Congress
United States proposed federal civil rights legislation